ETV 2 may refer to:

ETV2, Estonian television channel operated by ERR
ETV2 (India), Telugu news channel in Andhra Pradesh, India, operated by ETV Network